Joseph Anokye is a Ghanaian geodetic engineer and technology manager. He has worked with various organizations, including the National Aeronautics and Space Administration in the United States as a telecommunications service manager. He is a member of the New Patriotic Party and the current head of the National Communications Authority of Ghana.

Early life and education 
Anokye attended the Kwame Nkrumah University of Science and Technology in Kumasi and earned a degree in geodetic engineering. He moved to the United States where he enrolled at the University of Maryland University College and obtained a Master of Business Administration degree.

In August 2019, he was awarded a certificate of completion for the Senior Executives in National and International Security Programmes from the prestigious John F. Kennedy School of Government at Harvard University, Executive Education.

Working life 
Throughout his working life, Anokye has been involved in the development of platforms for improving the telecommunication capabilities of organizations and countries. He has worked with several Ghanaian companies, including Volta River Authority, Ghana Telecom, Ghana Commercial Bank and Ashanti Goldfields Corporation. Internationally, he helped in the initiation and development of internet services in Togo, Nigeria, The Gambia and other locations.

Work at NASA 
Anokye was hired at NASA in September 1997 and was stationed at the Goddard Space Flight Center. He was a team member of the technical network engineers who managed the authority's Global Mission Telecommunication Wide Area Network. He later managed the secure system that enabled the transfer of data, voice, and video between vehicles, equipment and base stations. He also collaborated with engineers from the Japan Aerospace Exploration Agency, the German Space Operations Centre, and the Canadian Space Agency on various space exploration and information transfer activities.

Return to Ghana
In February 2016, he returned to Ghana after working with NASA for eighteen years. He was appointed the Director of Technology for the New Patriotic Party. It was during this time that he developed software and technology platforms that allowed for the quick and correct tallying of the election results from all 275 parliamentary constituencies. The systems allowed parties to accurately predict the outcome of the 2016 Ghanaian general elections eight hours after polls were closed. The predictions were published days ahead of the official tabulation by the Electoral Commission of Ghana.

Hacking allegations

After the 2016 general elections in Ghana, several media houses, political agents and commentators expressed concerns about the tallying of the election results. These suspicions were based on comments made by the chairperson of Ghana's election commission, Charlotte Osei. The chairperson announced to the country that the commission's electronic vote transmission system had been hacked into. She asserted that due to the hack the final results could be compromised. Based on what Anokye had been doing for the New Patriotic Party, certain sections of the Ghanaian public believed that he was at the heart of the hacking allegation. Seven months after the elections, the People's National Convention revealed plans to formally petition the right authorities to investigate the claims of the electoral commission chair. Some opposition political party members believed that the unwillingness by the New Patriotic Party to investigate the issue was because the party had benefited from any hacking that had gone on. The allegations against Anokye have not been proven; some Ghanaians believe that the whole allegation was being used as a coverup to the election loss of the National Democratic Congress.

Head of NCA 
In January 2017, Nana Akufo-Addo, who had just been sworn in as President of Ghana, appointed Anokye as acting Director general of the National Communications Authority. He replaced William Matthew Tevie, whose term as director general had ended. His appointment was welcomed by several players in the communication sector of Ghana, including the Ghana Chamber of Telecommunications. His position as the head of the authority gives him an automatic seat on the National Communications Authority Board. Upon becoming the head of the authority, Anokye embarked on sanitizing the Ghanaian airwaves by making sure media houses operate within the stipulated guidelines. In September 2017, the authority sanctioned 131 media houses, threatening to close some of them due to violations. As head of the authority, Anokye reports to the Minister of Communication.

See also 
 National Communications Authority
 List of Kwame Nkrumah University of Science and Technology Alumni

References 

Living people
Ghanaian civil engineers
Kwame Nkrumah University of Science and Technology alumni
University of Maryland Global Campus alumni
New Patriotic Party politicians
People from Ashanti Region
Goddard Space Flight Center people
NASA people
Year of birth missing (living people)